Hunwick is a surname. Notable people with the surname include:

John Hunwick (1936–2015), English writer and academic
Matt Hunwick (born 1985), American ice hockey player
Shawn Hunwick (born 1987), American ice hockey player, brother of Matt